Ochna integerrima, popularly called yellow Mai flower (hoa mai, hoàng mai in southern Vietnam, although in the north, mai usually refers to Prunus mume), is a plant species in the genus Ochna and family Ochnaceae. In the wild, it is a small tree or shrub species (2-7 m tall). The timing of the yellow flowers of this plant make it very popular in southern Vietnam, where (often bonsai-style) plants are purchased during Tết.

In Vietnam, the variety of O. integerrima whose flowers have five petals is called mai vàng (yellow mai), whereas mai núi (mountain mai) flowers have between five and nine petals.

In Cambodia, it is called angkea, angkeasel, angkea loeung  or kongkea .

Ochna integerrima ( Chang nao) is the provincial flower of Mukdahan province, Thailand.

Gallery

Cultivation 
Ochna integerrima is hard to grow and also difficult to take care of. Farmers choose good seeds, soak them in water, and sow them in moist soil (either in pots or in a garden).

Ochna integerrima likes moist and light soil, cannot stand waterlogging. Therefore, it is necessary to grow Ochna integerrima in high places and water them regularly.

If growing in pots, pay attention to fertilizing and change the soil every year. To have a beautiful flower pot, we should often pay attention to cutting branches, bending branches, creating a posture to have unique shaped Ochna integerrima pots.

The legend of Ochna integerrima 
Vietnamese people have a fairy tale about Ochna integerrima. The story is about a kind and brave girl. She fought a monster to protect the villagers. Unfortunately, she died after the battle. Her bravery touched the gods. So, although she died, every New Year comes, she is revived to visit her family and her village for 9 days. When her parents died, she transformed into a flowering tree. Every time the New Year comes, the flowers bloom brightly like the yellow shirt she usually wears. That is Ochna integerrima.

Vietnamese people believe that, on Tet holiday, Ochna integerrima can banish ghosts throughout the year.

References

External links
 

integerrima
Trees of Vietnam
Flora of Indo-China
Taxa named by João de Loureiro